The Arctic realm is one of the planet's twelve marine realms, as designated by the WWF and Nature Conservancy. It includes the coastal regions and continental shelves of the Arctic Ocean and adjacent seas, including the Arctic Archipelago, Hudson Bay, and the Labrador Sea of northern Canada, the seas surrounding Greenland, the northern and eastern coasts of Iceland, and the eastern Bering Sea.

The Arctic realm transitions to the Temperate Northern Atlantic realm in the Atlantic Basin, and the Temperate Northern Pacific realm in the Pacific Basin.

Ecoregions
The Arctic realm is further subdivided into 19 marine ecoregions:

North Greenland
North and East Iceland
East Greenland Shelf
West Greenland Shelf
Northern Grand Banks-Southern Labrador
Northern Labrador
Baffin Bay-Davis Strait
Hudson Complex
Lancaster Sound
High Arctic Archipelago
Beaufort-Amundsen-Viscount Melville-Queen Maud
Beaufort Sea-continental coast and shelf
Chukchi Sea
Eastern Bering Sea
East Siberian Sea
Laptev Sea
Kara Sea
North and East Barents Sea
White Sea

References

External links
 Marine Ecoregions of the World (WWF)

Marine realms
Arctic Ocean